WAMA (1550 AM) is a radio station broadcasting a Regional Mexican format. Licensed to Tampa, Florida, United States, it serves the Tampa Bay area.  The station is currently owned by George and Esperanza Arroyo, through licensee Q Broadcasting Corporation.

The station broadcasts 24 hours a day with an omnidirectional antenna, but at a lower power at night.

Programming
Until April 2013, most programming on WAMA was provided by ESPN Deportes Radio.  The station does air one local program, Momento Deportivo ESPN 1550, hosted by Victor Rodriguez.

Previous logo

External links

FCC History Cards for WAMA

Hispanic and Latino American culture in Tampa, Florida
Mexican-American culture in Florida
AMA
Regional Mexican radio stations in the United States
AMA
1961 establishments in Florida
Radio stations established in 1961